Safaricom Telecommunications Ethiopia P.L.C. (STE), previously known as Global Partnership for Ethiopia BV (GPE), is an SPV awarded a licence to operate telecom services in Ethiopia at a license fee of US$850 million.  This fee made it the single largest foreign direct investment into Ethiopia. The firm is expected to roll out telephony services from 2022.

Shareholding 

, the shareholding of Safaricom Telecommunications Ethiopia was reported to be as follows:

New Developments
In February 2022, STE completed the assembly of a Tier III, pre-fabricated data centre, that was manufactured in China. The data centre, which cost US$100 million, will be used to route voice, internet and network communications on the STE network and to store data. The data center is reported to be the size of a "shipping container"

In April 2022, STE agreed in principle with Ethio Telecom for the latter to provide STE access to "cell sites, masts and other active elements such as network roaming". While the details have not been revealed as of 20 April 2022, a deal is imminent and an agreement is expected to be signed "soon".

See also 

 Telecommunications in Ethiopia

References 

Vodafone
Safaricom
Telecommunications companies established in 2021
Telecommunications companies of Ethiopia
2021 establishments in Ethiopia